Talisay, officially the Municipality of Talisay,  is a 3rd class municipality in the province of Batangas, Philippines. According to the 2020 census, it has a population of 46,238 people.

Geography
It is bordered in the north by Tagaytay, west by Laurel, east by Tanauan, and south by a vast volcanic lake called Taal Lake.

According to the Philippine Statistics Authority, the municipality has a land area of  constituting  of the  total area of Batangas.

Barangays
Talisay is politically subdivided into 21 barangays. In 1953, the sitio of Buco in the barrio of Balas was converted into a barangay.

Climate

Demographics

In the 2020 census, Talisay had a population of 46,238.

Educational Institutions

A. Primary

 Jorge B. Vargas Memorial Elementary School 
 Mcrew Educational Institute 
 Caloocan Elementary School 
 Santo Agustino Academy 
 Balas Elementary School 

 Banga Elementary School 

 Venancio Trinidad Sr. Memorial Elementary School 

 Quiling Elementary School 
 Dona Maria Laurel Platon Memorial School.

B. Secondary

 Balas Buco Sta. Maria National High School 
 Talisay Polytechnic Institute 
 Talisay High School 
 Talisay High School Senior High
 San Guillermo Academy 
 Talisay Senior High School

Economy

Government

 Mayor: Nestor D Natanauan
 Vice Mayor: Francis "Patet" Magsino
 Councilors
Rolly C.Lamano
Kap.Tess Panghulan
Sk Pres.Nestor A. Cabrera
Edgardo Caraan
Henry De Leon
Kap.Floring Mainot
Melody L. Luna
Felix "Bing" Salazar

Gallery

References

External links

[ Philippine Standard Geographic Code]

 
Municipalities of Batangas
Populated places on Taal Lake